Club Deportivo Aguila is a professional football club based in San Miguel, El Salvador, which plays in the Salvadoran league, Primera division. The first full-time manager for Aguila was Gregorio Bundio.

Conrado Miranda is the most successful manager in terms of trophies. He won three primera division titles and 1 CONCACAF Champions' Cup.

The second most successful Aguila manager in terms of trophies won is Hugo Coria, who won two Primera division titles and one Copa presidente trophy in his 4-year reign as manager.

List of managers

This is a list of head coaches of the Salvadoran football club C.D. Águila. Since the club was formed, Águila have had 49 coaches

Table key

References

External links
 http://www.cdaguila.com.sv/historia/

C.D. Águila
C.D. Aguila